Xu Wei (1521–1593) was a Ming dynasty painter and writer.

Xu Wei is also the name of:
Xu Wei (musician) (born 1968), Chinese rock musician
Xu Wei (badminton) (born 1995), female Chinese badminton player